Mutala Mohammed (born February 2, 1988, in Accra) is a Ghanaian footballer who currently plays for Hollywood United Hitmen in the USL Premier Development League.

Career

Africa
Mohammed turned professional in 2005 at the age of 16 when he signed for Ghana Premier League team Real Sportive. After impressing during a game against them, he moved to league rivals Asante Kotoko midway through the 2006 season. He was an integral part of the Asante Kotoko team which competed in the 2006 CAF Champions League, scoring an important goal against Tunisian side CS Sfaxien.

Mohammed was due to move to Tunisia to play for Étoile du Sahel in 2007, but returned to Ghana prior to the 2007-2008 pre-season. Asante Kotoko.

After trialing with Syrian side Al-Shorta Damascus during the second half of 2007, Mohammed eventually signed for Étoile du Sahel for the 2008–2009 season, and he played for them in the Tunisian Ligue Professionnelle 1.

United States
Mohammed left Tunisia and came to the United States in 2009. After spending some time playing in local amateur leagues, including a period playing for the L.A. Blues, he joined the Hollywood United Hitmen of USL Premier Development League in 2010. He scored his first career senior goal for Hollywood on June 3, 2010, in a 3–0 win over the BYU Cougars, and went on to play 15 games for the Hitmen during the season, helping them qualify for the 2010 PDL playoffs.

References

External links
 GhanaWeb profile
 VIDEO 1
 VIDEO 2

1988 births
Living people
Ghanaian footballers
Real Sportive players
Étoile Sportive du Sahel players
Hollywood United Hitmen players
USL League Two players
Association football defenders